Félix Galimi (1 January 1921 – 2 January 2005) was an Argentine fencer. He competed at the 1948, 1952 and 1964 Summer Olympics.

References

1921 births
2005 deaths
Argentine male fencers
Olympic fencers of Argentina
Fencers at the 1948 Summer Olympics
Fencers at the 1952 Summer Olympics
Fencers at the 1964 Summer Olympics
Fencers from Buenos Aires
Pan American Games medalists in fencing
Pan American Games gold medalists for Argentina
Pan American Games silver medalists for Argentina
Pan American Games bronze medalists for Argentina
Fencers at the 1951 Pan American Games
Fencers at the 1955 Pan American Games